Arandilla del Arroyo is a municipality in Cuenca, Castile-La Mancha, Spain. It had a population of 7 .

References

External links

Municipalities in the Province of Cuenca